Sven Montgomery (born 10 May 1976) is a former Swiss professional cyclist.

Career
Early on, Montgomery was considered to be a very promising rider. He was considered a climber. After finishing third in the 2000 Tour de l'Avenir, he won the fifth stage of the Grand Prix du Midi libre and the mountains classification of the Critérium du Dauphiné Libéré in 2001. He competed in four editions of the Tour de France, but failed to finish any.

Montgomery's career was overshadowed by bad luck. In 2001, during his best season, he was badly injured in a crash at the Tour de France, where he suffered several serious injuries to the face and head, making him almost blind. This heavy fall notably prevented him from riding for almost the entire following year. During the 2004 Giro d'Italia, he suffered multiple injuries, including a tear of his scapula and a broken collarbone. In addition, he fell badly ill in 2002.

Because of his numerous setbacks, Montgomery retired at the age of 30 in 2006.

Career achievements

Major results

1997
 2nd  Road race, European Under-23 Road Championships
1999
 2nd Overall UNIQA Classic
 3rd Wartenberg Rundfahrt
 5th Josef Voegeli Memorial
 6th Overall Tour de Suisse
 8th Overall Regio-Tour
2000
 3rd Overall Tour de l'Avenir
 4th Overall Tour de Suisse
 7th GP Industria & Commercio di Prato
 7th Josef Voegeli Memorial
 9th Giro dell'Emilia
 10th Overall Tour de Picardie
2001
 1st Stage 5 GP du Midi-Libre
 3rd Rominger Classic
 4th Overall Critérium du Dauphiné Libéré
1st  Mountains classification
 6th Overall Tour de Romandie
2003
 6th Luk-Cup Bühl
 8th Overall Tour de Suisse
2004
 1st  Mountains classification Tour de Romandie

Grand Tour general classification results timeline

External links

References

Living people
1976 births
Swiss male cyclists
People from Detmold
Sportspeople from Detmold (region)